The following is a list of places in the London Borough of Redbridge

Aldborough Hatch
Aldersbrook
Barkingside
Chadwell Heath
Clayhall
Cranbrook
Fairlop
Fullwell Cross
Gants Hill
Goodmayes
Hainault
Ilford
Little Heath
Loxford
Mayfield
Monkhams
Newbury Park
Redbridge
Seven Kings
Snaresbrook
South Woodford
Valentines
Wanstead
Wanstead Flats
Woodford
Woodford Bridge
Woodford Green

 
Lists of places in London